Luo or Lo refers to the Mandarin romanizations of the Chinese surnames 羅 (Simplified Chinese: 罗, pinyin: Luó, Jyutping: Lo4) and 駱 (Simplified Chinese: 骆, pinyin: Luò, Jyutping: Lok3). Of the two surnames, wikt:罗 is much more common among Chinese people. According to the Cantonese pronunciation, it can also refer to 盧.

In Cantonese, 罗/羅 is usually romanized as Lo and Law. In Teochew, 罗/羅 is most commonly transliterated as Low while in the Hokkien dialect it is romanized as Loke. In North Korea, 羅 is transcribed as 라 (Ra) and South Korea is transcribed as 나 (Na). In Vietnam, the name 羅 is pronounced La.

It is the 75th name on the Hundred Family Surnames poem.

Origins
The origin of the Luo surname dates back to descendants of Luo, a feudal state which existed during the Shang dynasty to the Warring States period (modern day Hubei).

Distribution
In 2019 it was the 20th most common surname in Mainland China.

Of the top 30 cities in China, 罗/羅 ranked eighth most common in Guiyang, ninth most common in Chongqing and Chengdu, and tenth most common in Changsha.

Prominent people

羅
 Andrew Lo, a professor at the MIT Sloan School of Management
 Lo Chen-Jung (born 1961), a retired Taiwanese left-handed baseball pitcher 
 Lo Chi Kwan (born 1981), a Hong Kong international football (soccer) player
 Luo Yunxi (born 1988), a Chinese actor
 Chia-Jen Lo (born 1986), a Taiwanese right-handed baseball pitcher for the Houston Astros
 Lo Chih-an (born 1988), a Taiwanese football (soccer) player, twin brother of Lo Chih-en, from the aborigine Atayal tribe of Taiwan
 Lo Chih-chiang (born 1970), Deputy Secretary-General to the President of the Republic of China (2012–2013)
 Lo Chih-en (born 1988), a Taiwanese football (soccer) player, twin brother of Lo Chih-an, from the aborigine Atayal tribe of Taiwan
 Dennis Law Sau-Yiu, Hong Kong film producer, screenwriter and director
 Lo Elgan (1901–1997), Chinese Academy of Social Sciences researcher
 Gallen Lo, a Hong Kong actor and singer who primarily acts in television series
 Luo Gan, retired Chinese politician
 Luo Guanzhong, Chinese writer who lived during the Yuan and Ming periods
 Luo Yigang (born 1975), Chinese badminton player
 Him Law, Hong Kong film and television actor
 Lo Hoi-sing (1949–2010), a Hong Kong businessman, born in a Hong Kong communist family
 Lo Hsiang-lin (1906–1978), one of the most renowned researchers in Hakka language and culture
 Jerry Lo (DJ Jerry, born 1972), a singer and songwriter, popular in Taiwan in the 1990s
 Justin Lo, a singer-songwriter, actor and record producer working in Hong Kong
 Leyan Lo (born 1985), held the world record of 11.13 seconds for the fastest Rubik's Cube solution
 Law Kar-ying, Hong Kong actor, originally a Cantonese Opera artist
 Lo Kuo-Chong (born 1965), a retired Taiwanese professional baseball player, now a baseball coach
 Kuo Hui Lo (born 1985), a Taiwanese baseball player in the Seattle Mariners organization
 Law Kwok-tai, football coach and former Republic of China (Taiwan) international footballer from Hong Kong
 Law Lan, Hong Kong actress
 Lo Lieh (1939–2002), a Hong Kong actor in martial-arts films
 Lo Mang (born 1956), a Hong Kong-based veteran martial artist
 Luo Meizhen (1885?–2013), claimant for the world's oldest person
 Nathan Law (born 1993), Hong Kong student activist, politician and member of the Legislative Council in Hong Kong
 Luo Ronghuan, Chinese communist military leader
 Luo Ying-shay, Minister of Justice of the Republic of China (2013–2016)
 Luo Jin, Chinese actor and singer
 Show Lo, Taiwanese actor, singer, and host
 Steven Lo (born 1959), a Hong Kong and Macanese businessman active in the entertainment world
 Lo Ta-yu, Taiwanese singer and songwriter
 Teddy Lo, a Hong Kong-based LED artist known for his work in the "tech-art" scene
 Lo Tsung-lo (1898–1978), a notable Chinese botanist and plant physiologist
 Victor Lo, GBS, OBE, JP (born 1950), the chairman and chief executive of Gold Peak Industries, Ltd. (Holdings)
 Vincent Lo (born 1948), the chairman of Hong Kong-based Shui On Group, a building-materials and construction firm
 Lo Wei (1918–1996), a Hong Kong film director and film actor, launched both Bruce Lee and Jackie Chan
 Law Wing-Cheong, Hong Kong film editor, an assistant director, film director, and actor
 Xianglin Luo (Lo Hsiang Lin), Renowned researchers in Hakka language and culture
 Lo Hsing Han (born 1935), Burmese business tycoon
 Na Yoon-Sun (born 1969), South Korean jazz singer
 Luo Meiyi 罗美仪 Bonnie Loo (born 1994), Singaporean singer and actress
 Yuen Tze Lo (1920–2002), electrical engineer and professor emeritus at University of Illinois at Urbana–Champaign
 Loh Kean Yew (born 1997), Singaporean badminton player
 Luo Yanlin (罗彦林), Gansu school teacher who was executed for sexually assaulting and raping 39 girls

Unknown
Bernard Lo, a TV anchor and host on Bloomberg TV Asia
Beth Lo (born 1949), an American artist
Eileen Yin-Fei Lo (1937–2022), educator, chef and author of eleven cookbooks on Chinese cuisine
Hollie Lo (born 1993), a Canadian actress, played Karena Eng in the movie Eve and the Fire Horse
Jason Lo, a Malaysian music artist, music producer, DJ and entrepreneur
Lo Hsiao-Ting (born 1982), a Taiwanese softball player
Lo Wing-lok JP (1954–2015), a Hong Kong doctor and politician
Lormong Lo, the first Hmong American to be appointed to a city council in the U.S, in 1994
Martin Lo, a spacecraft trajectory expert currently working for JPL
Ricky Lo, entertainment writer, showbiz commentator and host of Chinese descent in the Philippines

References

External links
 http://www.luoshi.net/
 https://web.archive.org/web/20060404030217/http://big5.ccnt.com.cn/china/surname/tribe/luo-1.htm
 http://www.greatchinese.com/surname/075.htm
 http://www.greatchinese.com/surname/152.htm

Chinese-language surnames
Multiple Chinese surnames

ru:Ло (фамилия)